The European Men's U-20 Handball Championship is the official competition for junior men's national handball teams of Europe, held by the European Handball Federation every two years. 

In addition to crowning the European champions, the tournament also serves as a qualifying tournament for the IHF Junior World Handball Championship.

Medal summary

Medal count

Participating nations

See also
European Men's Handball Championship
European Women's Junior Handball Championship

References

External links
 Official homepage of the European Handball Federation

 
European Handball Federation competitions
European youth sports competitions
Youth handball
1996 establishments in Europe
Recurring sporting events established in 1996